The Reading Railroad Heritage Museum is a railroad museum located at 500 S 3rd Street in Hamburg, Pennsylvania dedicated to the preservation of the Reading Railroad, owned and operated by the Reading Company Technical & Historical Society. It features several pieces of retired rolling stock, including Blueliners and Budd Rail Diesel Cars, plus a few model train layouts as well other railroad memorabilia. The museum is open year-round on Saturdays and Sundays.

Collection
All equipment built for the Reading and listed by original road number, unless specified.

Diesel Locomotives/Multiple Units
ALCO C424 #5204
ALCO C630 #5308
ALCO RS-3 #485
Baldwin DS-4-4-1000 #702
Budd RDC-1 #9152- Last RDC Built by Budd
Budd RDC-1 #9162
EMD FP7 #900
EMD FP7 #902 (on loan to Steamtown National Historic Site)
EMD GP7 #621
EMD GP30 #5513; First production model built
EMD GP35 #3640; Last locomotive overhauled and painted by the Reading 
EMD GP39-2 #3412; Operational 
EMD NW2 #103; Operational
EMD SW1200 #2719
GE U30C #6300
Norfolk Southern Road Slug #9905; rebuilt from FM H-24-66 Wabash #552.

Electric Multiple Units
Class EPB #863; Only surviving EPB EMU with its original seats
Class RER "Blueliner" #9104 
(ex-#305)
Class RER "Blueliner" #9110; Last Car on the final train to depart Reading Terminal 
(ex-#839)
Class RER "Blueliner" #9111 
(ex-#827)
Class RER "Blueliner" #9113
( ex-#833 )
Class RER "Blueliner" #9131
( ex-#881)

See also 
 Reading Company

References 

Museums in Berks County, Pennsylvania
Railroad museums in Pennsylvania
Model railroads
Museums established in 2008
Reading Company